Rahul Chaudhari (born 16 June 1993 ) is an Indian Kabaddi player, who has played as a defender and later became a magnificent raider. He was the first player ever to score 500, 700 and 800 raid points in Pro Kabaddi League. He was a member of the Indian National Kabaddi team that won a gold medal in the 2016 South Asian Games. After six seasons with Telugu Titans and one season for Tamil Thalaivas, Rahul now plays for Jaipur Pink Panthers.

Early life
Chaudhari was born to Rampal Singh and comes from Jalalpur Choiya village in Bijnor district of Uttar Pradesh. He started playing Kabaddi at the age of 13 in 2006.

Career

Telugu Titans
Chaudhari scored 151 raid points in Season 1. In the second season, he scored 98 raid points and 9 tackle points, and the third season saw him score 87 raid points and with 12 tackle points with a 41.37% tackle success rate.

The Telugu Titans reached the semi finals where they lost; Chaudhari took 14 raid points in the game. He was made captain of the Telugu Titans in Season 5, and finished the campaign with 193 points – 184 raid points and 9 tackle points.

For Season 6, Chaudhari was again bought by Telugu Titans for Rs 1,29,00,000, ending the season with 159 raid points and 7 tackle points.

Tamil Thalaivas
The Tamil Thalaivas bought Chaudhari for Season 7, bidding Rs 94,00,000 for him in the auction.

References

Living people
Indian kabaddi players
Pro Kabaddi League players
Kabaddi players at the 2018 Asian Games
Medalists at the 2018 Asian Games
Asian Games bronze medalists for India
Asian Games medalists in kabaddi
Place of birth missing (living people)
South Asian Games gold medalists for India
Year of birth missing (living people)
1990s births
South Asian Games medalists in kabaddi
People from Bijnor district